Conrado Buchanelli Holz (born 3 April 1997), commonly known as Conrado, is a Brazilian professional footballer who plays as a left-back or a midfielder for Lechia Gdańsk.

Club career

Gremio
Born in Ajuricaba, Conrado is a youth exponent from Grêmio. In 2017 he was promoted to the first team and made his league debut on 28 May 2017 against Sport Recife, starting as a left midfielder in a 4–3 away loss, playing the full 90 minutes.

Oeste
During the 2018 season Conrado joined Campeonato Brasileiro Série B side Oeste. He scored his first goal as a professional for the club on 20 March 2018 in a 1-0 victory over  Sertãozinho in the Campeonato Paulista Série A2. On 20 October 2018, Conrado scored his first goal in Série B, scoring the equalizer in a 1-1 draw with Avaí FC.

Figueirense
During October 2019, Conrado was announced as a new signing for Figueirense.  He made his debut for the club on 8 October 2019 in a 0-0 draw with Botafogo-SP in Série B.

Lechia Gdańsk
In January 2020, he joined Lechia Gdańsk. He made his Ekstraklasa debut on 7 February 2020 against Śląsk Wrocław as a left midfielder, assisting a goal scored by Flávio Paixão in a 2-2 draw. On 7 March 2020, Conrado scored his first goal for the club in a 4-4 draw with Zagłębie Lubin.

Personal life
Due to his family heritage, Conrado was eligible for both Italian and German citizenships. He obtained an Italian passport in 2020.

References

External links
 

1997 births
Living people
Association football midfielders
Brazilian footballers
Grêmio Foot-Ball Porto Alegrense players
Campeonato Brasileiro Série A players
Lechia Gdańsk players
Ekstraklasa players
Brazilian expatriate footballers
Expatriate footballers in Poland
Brazilian people of Italian descent
Brazilian people of German descent